Various Passeriformes (perching birds) are commonly referred to as warblers. They are not necessarily closely related to one another, but share some characteristics, such as being fairly small, vocal, and insectivorous.

Sylvioid warblers 
These are somewhat more closely related to each other than to other warblers. They belong to a superfamily also containing Old World babblers, bulbuls, etc.
 "Old World warblers", formerly all in family Sylviidae
 Leaf warblers, now in family Phylloscopidae
 Typical bush warblers, now in family Cettiidae
 Grass warblers and megalurid bush-warblers, now in family Locustellidae
 Marsh and tree warblers, now in family Acrocephalidae
 True warblers or sylviid warblers, remaining in family Sylviidae or moved into the Timaliidae
 Cisticolid warblers, family Cisticolidae
 Malagasy warblers, the newly assembled family Bernieridae

Passeroid warblers 
The two families of American warblers are part of another superfamily, which unites them with sparrows, buntings, finches, etc.
 Olive warbler, monotypic family Peucedramidae
 New World warblers, family Parulidae

Other 
 Tit-warblers or flycatcher-tits, family Stenostiridae
These are closely related to the titmice and chickadees

 Australasian warblers, family Acanthizidae
These are the most distinct group of warblers. They are not closely related at all to the others, but rather to the honeyeaters and fairy-wrens.

 Hawaiian honeycreeper—warbler-niched-(adaptive radiation), genus H. virens–common amakihi. (See: List of adaptive radiated honeycreepers)

References 

Wilson, Eisner, Briggs, Dickerson, Metzenberg, O'Brien, Susman, & Boggs. Life on Earth, Edward O. Wilson, Thomas Eisner, Winslow R. Briggs, Richard E. Dickerson, Robert L. Metzenberg, Richard D. O'Brien, Millard Susman, William E. Boggs, c 1973, Sinauer Associates, Inc., Publisher, Stamford, Connecticut. (hardcover)

Passeriformes
 
Bird common names